List of all members of the Storting in period 1981 to 1985.  The list includes all those initially elected to
Storting.

There were a total of 155 representatives, distributed among the parties: 65 (66 after the runoff) to Norwegian Labour Party,
54 (53 after the runoff) to Conservative Party of Norway, 15 to Christian Democratic Party of Norway, 11 to
Centre Party (Norway),
4 to Socialist Left Party, 2 to Progress Party (Norway) and 2 to Venstre (Norway).

There was a runoff in Buskerud.  Norwegian Labour Party won an additional seat at the expense of the Conservative Party of Norway.

Aust-Agder

Vest-Agder

Akershus

Buskerud

Before Runoff

After Runoff

Finnmark

Hedmark

Hordaland

Møre og Romsdal

Nordland

Oppland

Oslo

Rogaland

Sogn og Fjordane

Telemark

Troms

Nord-Trøndelag

Sør-Trøndelag

Vestfold

Østfold

 
Parliament of Norway, 1981–85